The Solomons boobook has been split into the following species:
 West Solomons owl, Athene jacquinoti
 Guadalcanal owl, Athene granti
 Malaita owl, Athene malaitae
 Makira owl, 	 Athene roseoaxillaris

Birds by common name